is a Tendai temple in Kiyama, Saga Prefecture, Japan.

History
The temple was founded by Gyōki in 717 A.D. It was razed in 835 A.D., however, it was restored by the Buddhist priest Ennin in 847. In the Kyōroku era around the year 1530 A.D., the temple was burnt down in a war. In 1542, however, the main hall was rebuilt by Tsukushi Korekado (筑紫惟門) who ruled the area. Later, in the Edo period, Kiyama became a part of Tsushima Province, and Sō Yoshinari, the feudal lord of Tsushima Domain helped rebuilt the temple in 1624.

The Eleven-Faced Kannon
The Statue of the Eleven-Faced Kannon (Guanyin or the Goddess of Mercy) is said to have been carved by a priest known as Gyōki. As a "hidden Buddha," it is concealed and can only be seen during the year of the horse every 12 years.

The Garden

 
The Chigiri-en (契園), behind the main hall, is a forested botanical garden at the foot of Mount Chigiri on the border between Chikushino in Fukuoka Prefecture and Kiyama in Saga Prefecture. In the gardens, in the latter half of April and the early half of May about 50,000 azalea plants are in bloom here in a whirl of color attracting hundreds of flower lovers.

References

External links
Official site 

Buddhist temples in Saga Prefecture
Tendai temples
Buildings and structures in Saga Prefecture